Peter Hobday may refer to:

 Peter Hobday (footballer) (born 1961), English footballer
 Peter Hobday (presenter) (1937–2020), British presenter